Ballymore (1969 – 1986) was an Irish thoroughbred racehorse and sire. A  talented although somewhat fragile horse, who was difficult to train,  he made only five racecourse appearances but recorded two major victories. Unraced as a juvenile he made a notable racecourse debut by winning the Irish 2000 Guineas by three lengths in May 1972. He was beaten in a slowly-run edition of the Gallinule Stakes and then finished third in the Irish Derby before missing the rest of the season. He ran poorly on his first run as a four-year-old but then defeated Roberto at level weights in the Nijinsky Stakes in May. He never ran again and was retired from racing at the end of the year. He had some success as a breeding stallion in Ireland.

Background
Ballymore was a bay horse with no white markings bred in Ireland by the Ardenode Stud, which was owned and managed by Jim and Meg Mullion. During his racing career, Ballymore raced in the colours of Meg Mullion and was trained by Paddy Prendergast.

He was sired by Ragusa, the winner of Irish Derby, King George VI and Queen Elizabeth Stakes and St. Leger Stakesin 1963 and the Eclipse Stakes in the following year. His other notable progeny included The Derby winner Morston and the Ascot Gold Cup winner Ragstone. His dam Paddy's Sister was unbeaten in five starts as a juvenile including the Gimcrack Stakes against colts, but newer ran again after sustaining an injury. Although she was twelve years old when foaling Ballymore, she had produced only two previous live foals. One of these was Paddy's Flair who produced the Poule d'Essai des Pouliches winner Ukraine Girl and was the female-line ancestor of the outstanding steeplechaser Bobs Worth.

Racing career

1972: three-year-old season
Ballymore did not race as a two-year-old in 1971 owing to his physical immaturity and some problems with lameness. In the spring of 1972 he was slow to reach fitness and did not have a trial race before making his racecourse debut in the Irish 2000 Guineas over one mile on soft ground at the Curragh on 13 May. He was given little chance of winning and started a 33/1 outsider whilst his stablemate and close relative Flair Path (ridden by Lester Piggott) was strongly fancied. The English 2000 Guineas winner High Top was made the odds-on favourite ahead of Flair Path whilst the best fancied of the other eleven runners were Home Guard (winner of the Tetrarch Stakes, Martinmas (Greenham Stakes) and Bog Road (Futurity Stakes). High Top led before giving way to Martinmas at half distance with Ballymore, partnered by Christy Roche appearing to be struggling towards the rear. Ballymore began to make progress three furlongs from the finish and produced a strong run on the outside in the final furlong to take the lead and win by three lengths from Martinmas. After the race Prendergast commented that the colt might be the best horse that he had ever trained.

Ballymore was stepped up in distance for the Gallinule Stakes over ten furlongs at the Curragh in June. The race was somewhat farcical as all four jockeys had been told to restrain ("hold up") their mounts, resulting in the contest being run at a slow canter before developing into a sprint in the last quarter mile. Ballymore became unbalanced when the pace abruptly changed and finished second, four lengths behind Bog Road. In the Irish Derby over one and a half miles at the Curragh on 1 July Ballymore (ridden by Piggott) started 3/1 second favourite behind The Derby winner Roberto in a fourteen-runner field which also included Lyphard, Bog Road, Steel Pulse and Scottish Rifle. He reached third place on the final turn but came under pressure and was unable to make further progress, coming home third behind Steel Pulse and Scottish Rifle.

Prendergast's belief that the colt needed soft ground to show his best form meant that Ballymore did not race again in 1972.

1973: four-year-old season
On his first appearance as a four-year-old Ballymore was sent to France for the Prix d'Inauguration over 1600 metres at Every Racecourse in April and finished last of the six runners behind Gift Card. In May he was matched against Roberto at level weights in the Nijinsky Stakes over ten furlongs at Leopardstown Racecourse. Roberto started te odd-son favourite but Ballymore got the better of a sustained struggle in the closing stages to win by three quarters of a length. As in 1972, Ballymore did not race in the second half of the season, with Prendergast blaming the firm ground which prevented him from training the horse effectively.

Assessment
In 1972 the independent Timeform organisation gave Ballymore a rating of 123, eleven pounds behind their top-rated three-year-old colts Deep Diver and Sallust. He received the same rating from Timeform in 1973. In their annual "Racehorses of 1973" Timeform commented that he was a good horse, but not a very good one, adding that if he had been able to race more frequently "there might have been a different story to tell".

Stud record
Ballymore was retired from racing and became a breeding stallion at the Ardenode Stud, ostensibly as a replacement for his sire Ragusa who had died in May 1973. He began his stud career at a fee of 1,500 guineas. The best of his offspring included More So (Irish 1000 Guineas), Ore (Henry II Stakes), Seymour Hicks (Great Voltigeur Stakes), Exdirectory (runner-up in the Irish Derby), More Heather (Park Stakes), Raqcuette (third in The Oaks) and Call Collect (Foxhunter Chase). He died in June 1986 at the age of seventeen.

Pedigree

References 

1969 racehorse births
1986 racehorse deaths
Racehorses bred in Ireland
Racehorses trained in Ireland
Thoroughbred family 7
Irish Classic Race winners